Yvonne Bourgeois (6 May 1902 – 12 May 1983) was a French tennis player. She competed in the doubles event at the 1924 Summer Olympics with compatriot Marguerite Billout. They reached the semifinal in which they lost in straight sets to Phyllis Covell and Kathleen McKane. In the bronze medal match they lost to Dorothy Shepherd-Barron and Evelyn Colyer, also in straight sets.

In 1928 she competed in the Wimbledon Championships, reaching the second round in singles, the third round in doubles and the first round in mixed doubles.

References

External links
 

1902 births
1983 deaths
French female tennis players
Olympic tennis players of France
Tennis players at the 1924 Summer Olympics
Tennis players from Paris
20th-century French women